Kedrovaya Pad (lit. Korean Pine Valley) is a nature reserve (gosudarstvenny prirodny biosferny zapovednik) on the territory of Khasansky District in the south of Primorsky Krai, Russia.

Topography
Kedrovaya Pad is at the coastal spurs of the Manchurian mountains.  The reserve's boundaries approach Barabashevka River (until 1973 Mongugay or Bolshoy Mongugay) in the northeast, and Narva River (until 1973 Sidimi) in the southwest.  In the southeast, the Far Eastern Railway separates it from Amur Bay which is less than 5 km away. In the northwest, the A189 (AH6) road separates it from the Chyornye Gory range, whose watershed  defines the Sino-Russian border and is less than 20 km away.

Sukhorechensky Ridge covers the southern half of the reserve, reaching  at Gora Uglovaya (or Zapretnaya) in the west. North of it, Kedrovaya River forms a gorge as it flows east from its source in the western part of the reserve.

While some kind of nature protection measures have been in effect in the area since 1916, the reserve was officially established in 1925, making it the oldest nature reserve in the Russian Far East.

Ecoregion and climate
The reserve is located in the Manchurian mixed forests ecoregion.  The climate is Humid continental climate, warm summer subtype (Köppen climate classification (Dwb)).

Flora and fauna
The nature of the reserve is unique in a sense that its high biodiversity represents an overlap of southern (subtropical forests) and northern (coniferous-broadleaf forests) species and animals. Some of the species endemic to the area include the Siberian tiger, Amur leopard, and Asian black bear.

References

External links
 Ministry of Natural Resources and the Environment.ru: Official Kedrovaya Pad Nature Reserve website—
 Ministry of Natural Resources and the Environment.ru:  Kedrovaya Pad Media gallery
 Russian Academy of Sciences, Far Eastern Branch.ru: Kedrovaya Pad website 
 Russian Academy of Sciences, Far Eastern Branch.ru: Map of Kedrovaya Pad

Nature reserves in Russia
Geography of Primorsky Krai
Protected areas of the Russian Far East
Zapovednik
Protected areas established in 1925
1925 establishments in Russia
1925 establishments in the Soviet Union